Mahendragiri is the name of the following places in India:
 Mahendragiri, Odisha, a hill or mountain in Eastern Ghats, Gajapati district, Odisha, India
 Mahendragiri, Tamil Nadu, a hill or mountain in Eastern Ghats, Tirunelveli District, Tamil Nadu, India
Mahendra Mountains, mountain range described in Indian epics, identified with the Eastern Ghats